Captured is a 1998 direct-to-video action film directed by Peter Liapis and starring Nick Mancuso, Andrew Divoff, Michael Mahonen and Linda Hoffman.

Plot
The film follows Holden Downs (Nick Mancuso), a powerful, hot-tempered workaholic real estate developer struggling with an environmental injunction against a property that he plans to build, which threatens to halt construction of his dream development. Brothers Joey (Michael Mahonen) and Robert Breed (Andrew Divoff) attempt to steal Holden's prized possession, a Porsche 911 Turbo until Holden arrives, fights him off and breaks his arm. Robert creates a diversion, knocks Holden down and threatens to steal his car again. Holden enlists the help of his nephew Buddy (Seth Peterson) to reinforce his car's security system, as Holden continues to deal with worsening news about his property development and his crumbling marriage with his wife, Faye Downs (Linda Hoffman).

Robert breaks into his house and subsequently attempts stealing the car again, but discovers its new security features: Bulletproof glass, reinforced interior, remote-controlled windows and stereo, and a lockdown feature where he is trapped within the car and held hostage. After refusing to cooperate with Holden, he begins torturing Robert by blaring loud music and withholding food and water after mocking him the next day. Meanwhile, Holden loses his case and employees, but then suddenly remembers that his maid (Luisa Leschin) is at his house and rushes home just in time to prevent her from entering the garage, where Robert has been honking the horn to summon for help after seeing her. Robert continues to mock Holden to the point where he fires a warning shot at Robert, but winds up in a scuffle and Holden replicates Sharia Law and cuts off Robert's fingers with pruning shears.

After seeing Holden's scuffle with an environmentalist (Thad Geer) on the news, Faye decides to return home from visiting her sister Sheila (Beth Tegarden) earlier than planned. Deciding that Robert still hasn't come home, Joey decides to look for him and sneaks into Holden's house, Holden encounters Joey and several fights erupt until Joey is shot and killed. After Harry (Paul Collins) visits and announces that he has reached an agreement, Holden leaves for a meeting. Meanwhile, Faye returns home to find Robert trapped in the car, where she opens the door for him, only for her to be locked in. Robert soon destroys the phone lines and waits for Holden to return, then locks Holden in the car while holding Faye hostage and taunting him. Meanwhile, Holden calls Buddy for help. As Buddy frees him, Holden runs back in the house armed with a Speargun and instructs him to hide in the garage. However, Buddy decides to run into the house anyway to try to help, only to get shot when he is mistaken for Robert. Soon, Robert and Holden encounter each other and begin having a scuffle, only to be interrupted by Faye with a gun pointed at both of them. As they both try to reason with her, she eventually shoots Holden. The film ends with Faye and Robert sitting on the floor.

Cast
 Nick Mancuso - Holden Downs
 Andrew Divoff - Robert Breed
 Linda Hoffman - Faye Downs
 Michael Mahonen - Joey Breed
 Seth Peterson - Buddy
 Paul Collins - Harry
 Christopher Kriesa - Charlie
 Beth Tegarden - Sheila
 Luisa Leschin - Gladys
 Thad Geer - Marcus Tanner (in credits; though often referred to as Carl Tanner)
 Lisa Long - Cindy
 Ray Rodriguez - Security guard
 Tricia Lee Pascoe - Reporter

External links
 

1998 films
American action thriller films
1998 action thriller films
1990s English-language films
1990s American films